Céphale et Procris (Cephalus and Procris) is an opera by the French composer Élisabeth Jacquet de La Guerre. It takes the form of a tragédie en musique in five acts with an allegorical prologue. The libretto, by Joseph-François Duché de Vancy, is loosely based on the myth of Cephalus and Procris as told in Ovid's Metamorphoses. The opera was first performed by the Paris Opéra at the Théâtre du Palais-Royal on 17 March 1694.

Unsurprisingly, the music shows the influence of Jean-Baptiste Lully, the founder of the French genre of tragédie en musique, who had died less than a decade before. But Jacquet de La Guerre added original touches of her own to the Lullian formula, such as a quiet conclusion in place of the expected final chorus.

Performance history

Céphale et Procris was not a success and only ran for five or six performances before disappearing from the stage until a revival of interest in the work in the late 20th century. Wanda R. Griffiths, who has edited the opera, has proposed some reasons for this failure: the poor literary quality of the libretto, with its confused plot; and the cultural climate of Paris in the 1690s, which was generally unfavourable to new operas. Parisian audiences looked to King Louis XIV as their arbiter of taste and the king had lost interest in opera, probably under the influence of his religiously conservative wife Madame de Maintenon. At the time, Catholic religious authorities were attacking opera as a "sensuous" form of entertainment. French national morale was also low as the result of a series of military defeats.

Roles

Synopsis
The opera begins with a prologue celebrating the glory of King Louis XIV. The main opera (Acts I to V) is set in Athens. Céphale, a warrior, and Procris, the daughter of the King of Athens, are in love but are yet to be married (in this the opera differs from Ovid where they are already man and wife). Borée, Prince of Thrace, is Céphale's rival for Procris's hand and the gods help him press his claim, particularly L'Aurore (Aurora, the goddess of dawn) who is in love with Céphale and wants him for herself. When L'Aurore believes Céphale has rejected her, she conjures up demons to cast a spell so Procris will believe Céphale has been unfaithful to her. The spell works but the goddess has a sudden change of heart and convinces Procris that Céphale has always been true to her. Procris finds Céphale and Borée engaged in a fight. When she tries to intervene, Céphale accidentally wounds her with an arrow, and she dies leaving her lover grief-stricken.

Recording
Céphale et Procris Soloists, Musica Fiorita, conducted by Daniela Dolci (ORF Alte Edition, 2008, 2 CDs)

References

Sources
Period libretto (according to Paris's copy), in Recueil des Opera, des Ballets, & des plus belles Pièces en Musique, qui ont été représentées depuis dix ou douze ans jusques à présent devant sa Majesté très Chrestienne, Volume V, Amsterdam, Schelte, 1700 (accessible for free online at Google Books)
Original printed score:  or at Gallica - B.N.F.
Modern libretto (with English translation) and score: Jacquet de La Guerre, Elisabeth-Claude, Cephale et Procris (edited by Wanda R. Griffiths), Madison, A-R Editions, 1998

Operas
Opera world premieres at the Paris Opera
French-language operas
1694 operas
Tragédies en musique
Operas by Élisabeth Jacquet de La Guerre
Operas based on Metamorphoses